The following is a list of Pacific typhoon seasons from 1920 to 1937. Data from these years was extremely unreliable, so there were many more typhoons that did not hit land and were not detected by ships. The average from these times was 23 tropical storms, which now would be considered a well-below-average season.

Pacific typhoon seasons

1901, 1902–1919, 1920–1937, 1938, 1939

1920

In 1920, there were 20 tropical cyclones in the western Pacific Ocean.

1921

In 1921, there were 24 tropical cyclones in the western Pacific Ocean.

1922

In 1922, there were 24 tropical cyclones in the western Pacific Ocean.

On July 27, a typhoon struck southwestern China near Shantou, killing an estimated 100,000 people.

1923

In 1923, there were 26 tropical cyclones in the western Pacific Ocean.

On August 12, a typhoon struck China, killing 100 people around Hong Kong.

In September, a typhoon struck the Japanese island of Honshu, killing 3,000 people and leaving US$10 million in damage.

1924

In 1924, there were 25 tropical cyclones in the western Pacific Ocean.

1925

In 1925, there were 22 tropical cyclones in the western Pacific Ocean.

1926

In 1926, there were 19 tropical cyclones in the western Pacific Ocean.

1927

1928

In 1928, there were 22 tropical cyclones in the western Pacific Ocean.

1929

In 1929, there were 22 tropical cyclones in the western Pacific Ocean.

1930

In 1930, there were 25 tropical cyclones in the western Pacific Ocean.

1931

1932

In 1932, there were 27 tropical cyclones in the western Pacific Ocean.

In late April, a typhoon moved across the Sulu Archipelago in the southern Philippines, killing 147 people.

1933

In 1933, there were 29 tropical cyclones in the western Pacific Ocean.

1934

In 1934, there were 29 tropical cyclones in the western Pacific Ocean.

In July, a typhoon killed four people when it struck Luzon in the Philippines. Another typhoon in November struck Samar, killing 85 people.

In September, a typhoon struck Muroto, killing 3,066 people and leaving US$300 million in damage.

In October, another typhoon impacted Philippines. It killed five people and caused property damages in Manila.

1935

In 1935, there were 24 tropical cyclones in the western Pacific Ocean.

A typhoon which made landfall in Japan in late September was reported as causing several hundred casualties and destroying around 75,000 houses. The Japanese fleet was caught at sea in what became known as the "Fourth Fleet Incident", with several ships heavily damaged and over fifty deaths.

1936

In 1936, there were 24 tropical cyclones in the western Pacific Ocean.

On August 28, a typhoon struck South Korea, killing 1,104 people.

In October, a typhoon struck Luzon, killing 517 people.

1937

In 1937, there were 22 tropical cyclones in the western Pacific Ocean. This was a very deadly season.

On September 2, a powerful typhoon struck Hong Kong, killing about 11,000 people.

In November, a typhoon struck Luzon, killing 38 people. In the same month, another typhoon killed 231 people.

See also
 1900–1940 South Pacific cyclone seasons
 1900–1950 South-West Indian Ocean cyclone seasons
 1920s Australian region cyclone seasons
 1930s Australian region cyclone seasons

References

Pre-1940 Pacific typhoon seasons